Victor Nelson Huxley (23 September 1906 – 24 June 1982 in Brisbane. Queensland) was a speedway rider who won the Star Riders' Championship, the forerunner of the Speedway World Championship, in 1930 and finished runner-up in 1931 and 1932. He also won the London Riders' Championship in 1936 whilst with the Wimbledon Dons.

Huxley won the 1934 Australian Championship (3 Laps) in front of his home crowd at the Brisbane Exhibition Ground.

Vic Huxley retired from British speedway at the end of the 1936 season and returned to Australia where he rode in the Winter test series against England. He lived in Ashgrove in Brisbane, and set up a motorcycle business in Adelaide Street called the "British Motorcycle Corporation" which he ran until the mid-1960s.

Huxley died in his home town of Brisbane on 24 June 1982 at the age of 75, just 3 months shy of his 76th birthday.

World Final appearances
 1936 –  London, Wembley Stadium – 8th – 17pts

Players cigarette cards
Huxley is listed as number 20 of 50 in the 1930s Player's cigarette card collection.

References

External links
Vic Huxley early career biography
Vic Huxley at the Australian Dictionary of Biography online

1906 births
1982 deaths
Australian speedway riders
Wimbledon Dons riders
Harringay Racers riders
Motorcycle racers from Brisbane